Hydnellum nigellum is a tooth fungus in the family Bankeraceae. Found in Nova Scotia, Canada, where it grows under spruce, it was described as new to science in 1964 by Canadian mycologist Kenneth A. Harrison.

References

External links

Fungi described in 1964
Fungi of North America
Inedible fungi
nigellum